The church of San Juan is in the village of Alevia, Asturias, Spain. Founded in the late 14th century, the building is currently a Baroque temple with remnants of the original Gothic construction. There is a Gothic nave with side porch and double chapel on the north side.

See also
Asturian art
Catholic Church in Spain

References

Churches in Asturias
14th-century establishments in Spain
14th-century Roman Catholic church buildings in Spain
Gothic architecture in Asturias
Baroque architecture in Asturias